Bader Al Samak (born 1 January 1988) is a professional  Kuwaiti footballer. Now playing with Al-Salmiya SC as a central midfielder, he participated in the 52nd Prince Cup with Al-Salmiya SC.

References

1988 births
Living people
Kuwaiti footballers
Kuwait international footballers
Olympic footballers of Kuwait
Al Salmiya SC players
Association football forwards
Sportspeople from Kuwait City
Al-Yarmouk SC (Kuwait) players
Al Tadhamon SC players
Kuwait Premier League players